Jichu Qullu (Aymara jichu, wichhu Peruvian feather grass (stipa ichu), qullu mountain, "stipa ichu mountain", also spelled Hichocollo, Icho Ccollo, Ichu Khollu, Ichu Kkollu, Ichocollo, Ichuccollu, Ichucollo, Jichu Kkollu, Jichuccollo) may refer to:

 Jichu Qullu (Bolivia-Peru), a mountain at the border of Bolivia and Peru
 Jichu Qullu (Peru), a mountain in the Moquegua Region, Peru
 Jichu Qullu (San Antonio de Chuca), a mountain in the San Antonio de Chuca District, Caylloma Province, Arequipa Region, Peru
 Jichu Qullu (Tacna), a mountain in the Tacna Region, Peru
 Jichu Qullu (Tapay), a mountain in the Tapay District, Caylloma Province, Arequipa Region, Peru
 Jichu Qullu (Tarucani), a mountain in the Tarucani District, Arequipa Province, Arequipa Region, Peru

See also 
 Wichhu Qullu (disambiguation)